The Brookings Commercial Historic District, in Brookings, South Dakota, is a  historic district which was listed on the National Register of Historic Places in 1988.

The listing included 39 contributing buildings in an area roughly along Main Ave. between the former C&NW railroad and the alley north of Fifth St.

It includes Beaux Arts and Art Deco architecture.

It includes Nick's Hamburger Shop, which was separately listed on the National Register.

References

Historic districts on the National Register of Historic Places in South Dakota
Beaux-Arts architecture in South Dakota
Art Deco architecture in South Dakota
Brookings County, South Dakota